David Nicholas Wilson (born 1984) is a prolific British sex offender.

Wilson, a labourer living in Kirstead, King's Lynn, Norfolk, England, preyed on his victims online. He obtained many indecent images and videos of boys by pretending to be a teenage girl in order to trick them into sending the images and videos of themselves and other children. He blackmailed his victims into sending more extreme images and videos of themselves and in some cases of them sexually abusing other children.

On 23 November 2020 at Ipswich Crown Court, he admitted 96 sexual offences against 51 boys aged between four and 14, which he committed between May 2016 and April 2020. On 10 February 2021, he was sentenced to 25 years imprisonment.

References

1984 births
Living people
21st-century English criminals
Criminals from Norfolk
Date of birth missing (living people)
English male criminals
English prisoners and detainees
English people convicted of child pornography offences
People from King's Lynn
Place of birth missing (living people)
Prisoners and detainees of England and Wales